Martin Tešovič (born 26 October 1974 in Bratislava) is a weightlifter from Slovakia who competed from the mid-1990s to the mid-2000s. He competed three times for his native country at the Summer Olympics: 1996 (10th: middle heavyweight) and 2004 (no total, 105 kg category) and 2012 where he placed 11th in the 105 kg category with a total of 363 kg.  At the 2008 Summer Olympics he was supposed to compete, but he did not enter the event.

Tešovič is best known for winning the world title at the 1997 World Weightlifting Championships in the men's sub-heavyweight class (– 99 kg) with a total of 400 kg.

At the 2005 World Weightlifting Championships he placed third with a total of 412 kg and was only 1 kg behind the silver medalist Alexandru Bratan.

Since 2008, Tešovič has competed in bobsleigh. He crashed out during the first run of the four-man event at the 2010 Winter Olympics in Vancouver. Tešovič's best finish was fifth in a lesser cup four-man event at Lake Placid, New York in April 2009.

References

External links
 
 
 
 

1974 births
Bobsledders at the 2010 Winter Olympics
Living people
Olympic bobsledders of Slovakia
Olympic weightlifters of Slovakia
Sportspeople from Bratislava
Slovak male bobsledders
Slovak male weightlifters
Weightlifters at the 1996 Summer Olympics
Weightlifters at the 2004 Summer Olympics
Weightlifters at the 2012 Summer Olympics
European Weightlifting Championships medalists
World Weightlifting Championships medalists
20th-century Slovak people
21st-century Slovak people